Janice "Jan" Betker (born July 19, 1960, in Regina, Saskatchewan) is a Canadian curler.  Betker is best known for playing third on the Sandra Schmirler rink that won three world championships and an Olympic gold medal in the 1990s. Following Schmirler's death from cancer in 2000, Betker replaced her as the team's skip.

In 2019, Betker was named the greatest Canadian female third in history in a TSN poll of broadcasters, reporters and top curlers.

Curling career
As part of the Schmirler team Betker won 3 Canadian curling championships in 1993, 1994, and 1997.  As well the team also won 3 world championships in 1993, 1994, and 1997.  In 1998 the team won the Gold Medal for curling at the Nagano Olympics.  Betker also won a Canadian Mixed Curling Championship in 1984 as the lead for Randy Woytowich.

At first Betker refused to skip the team following the death of her longtime skip Schmirler.  However, in 2003 Betker took over as skip and took her team to the 2003 Scott Tournament of Hearts.  The team finished fourth overall.

In 2005, at the Canada Cup of Curling, Betker and her team placed second.  However this showing was still enough to win them a spot at the 2005 Canadian Olympic Trials in Halifax as the winner of the event, Shannon Kleibrink already had won an Olympic Trial berth.  
Betker finished 4-5 at the event with Kleibrink the eventual winner.

Betker returned to the national championships in 2007. Joan McCusker, who had played second for both Schmirler and Betker retired from competitive curling and was replaced by her sister, Nancy Inglis.  Sherry Linton, former third, joined Jolene McIvor's rink for the 2006-2007 season and was replaced by newcomer, Lana Vey. Betker's team made it all the way to the final before losing to Kelly Scott. After the season, Betker announced she was "taking a break" from curling. She returned for three World Curling Tour events in 2008-09 and one in 2011-12, but has not curled competitively since. 

In 2017, Betker stopped curling entirely.

Personal life
She is an administrator with Laurie Artiss The Pin People.

References

External links
 

1960 births
Living people
Canadian women curlers
Olympic curlers of Canada
Olympic gold medalists for Canada
Olympic medalists in curling
Medalists at the 1998 Winter Olympics
Canadian people of German descent
Curlers at the 1998 Winter Olympics
Curlers from Regina, Saskatchewan
World curling champions
Canadian women's curling champions
Canadian mixed curling champions
Canada Cup (curling) participants